Podsedice is a municipality and village in Litoměřice District in the Ústí nad Labem Region of the Czech Republic. It has about 700 inhabitants.

Administrative parts
Villages of Chrášťany, Děkovka, Obřice and Pnětluky are administrative parts of Podsedice.

References

Villages in Litoměřice District